Nathan William Byrne (born 5 June 1992) is an English professional footballer who plays for Charlotte FC. He can play as either a wing back or a right-back.

Byrne began his professional career with Tottenham but never made a first team appearance for the club before leaving to join League One Swindon Town in 2013. After two full seasons with the Robins, during which they reached the 2015 League One play-off final, he was bought by Championship side Wolverhampton Wanderers. However, he only remained with the club for a year before moving on to Wigan Athletic.

Career

Tottenham Hotspur
Byrne played for St Albans City as a youth player, before becoming a Tottenham Hotspur player, signing professional forms in June 2010.

In February 2011, he was loaned out to Brentford of League One. He made his senior debut on 26 February, replacing Myles Weston 77 minutes into a 1–0 home win over Bristol Rovers. He won his first start at Griffin Park on 8 March, playing in a 1–0 defeat to Brighton & Hove Albion. He was singled out for praise for his performance against Brighton by manager Nicky Forster.

On 28 July 2011, English League One club Bournemouth signed Byrne on loan until the end of the season. In a match against Exeter on 17 September 2011 Byrne suffered an ankle injury that would keep him out of action until the new year, he chose to remain at Bournemouth for treatment. On 22 February 2012, Byrne was recalled to Tottenham having made his return from injury in a Spurs XI friendly the day before.

Byrne was signed by Crawley Town on loan on 24 September 2012 till 6 January 2013. He made 14 starts and 1 substitute appearance, scoring once, his first ever league goal, at Carlisle United on 29 September 2012.

Swindon Town (loan and permanent transfer)
On 28 March 2013, Byrne signed for Swindon Town on a loan deal that would see him at the County Ground for the rest of the 2012–13 season.

On 26 April 2013, Nathan agreed to sign for Swindon Town on a free transfer following a successful loan spell at the club from Tottenham Hotspur. During the second leg of the League One playoffs against Brentford, he received a red card during extra time after Swindon equalised late in the first half to make the score 3–3.

Byrne made 43 league appearances during the 2014–15 season and helped Swindon make the play-offs. having contributed 3 goals and 9 assists in the league, he also made the League One team of the year.
           
During the first leg of the League One play-off semi final against Sheffield United away, he scored the winning goal for Swindon on 93 minutes to make the score 2–1 and carry a one-goal advantage back to the County Ground.

Byrne scored a hat-trick on the opening day of the 2015–16 season in a 4–1 win against Bradford City.

Wolverhampton Wanderers
On 1 September 2015 Byrne joined Championship club Wolverhampton Wanderers, signing a three-year contract (with the option of a fourth year) for an undisclosed fee. He made his club debut on 19 September 2015 as a substitute in a goalless draw against Brighton, with his first start coming later that month in a 3–0 win at Fulham. Byrne scored his first goal for the club on 17 December, a late consolation in a 2–3 home loss to Leeds United. His second and final goal for the club also came at Molineux, when he opened the scoring in a 2–1 win over Bristol City on 8 March 2016. What was to be his final appearance for the club came as a late substitute in a 1–1 draw at eventual champions Burnley on 19 March, where his last-minute corner was headed in by Danny Batth.

Wigan Athletic
On 31 August 2016, almost a year after joining Wolves and having not featured under new coach Walter Zenga, Byrne departed to join newly promoted Championship side Wigan Athletic for an undisclosed fee in a three-year deal.

On 9 January 2017 it was announced that Byrne had joined League 1 side Charlton Athletic on loan for the remainder of the season. He scored his first goal for the club in a 2–1 win over Bolton Wanderers on 28 January 2017.

In April 2019 Byrne was subjected to racist tweets.

Derby County
On 10 September 2020 he became a new Derby County player.

Charlotte FC
On 4 August 2022, Byrne signed for Major League Soccer club Charlotte FC on a two-year contract with the option for a further year.

Career statistics

Honours
Wigan Athletic
EFL League One: 2017–18

Individual
PFA Team of the Year: 2014–15 League One, 2017–18 League One
EFL Team of the Season: 2017–18
Wigan Athletic Player of the Year: 2017–18
Wigan Athletic Players' Player of the Year: 2017–18

References

External links

Academy & Reserve Profile at the Official Tottenham Hotspur site

1992 births
Living people
Sportspeople from St Albans
People educated at Parmiter's School, Garston
English footballers
Association football midfielders
St Albans City F.C. players
Tottenham Hotspur F.C. players
Brentford F.C. players
AFC Bournemouth players
Crawley Town F.C. players
Swindon Town F.C. players
Wolverhampton Wanderers F.C. players
Wigan Athletic F.C. players
Charlton Athletic F.C. players
Derby County F.C. players
Charlotte FC players
English Football League players
English expatriate footballers
Expatriate soccer players in the United States
English expatriate sportspeople in the United States
Major League Soccer players